Trifluoromethanesulfonyl azide or triflyl azide  is an organic azide used as a reagent in organic synthesis.

Preparation
Trifluoromethanesulfonyl azide is not commercially available. It is prepared before use by reacting trifluoromethanesulfonic anhydride with sodium azide, traditionally in dichloromethane. However, use of dichloromethane should be avoided because sodium azide is known to generate highly explosive azido-chloromethane and diazidomethane in situ by nucleophilic substitution on dichloromethane. Moreover, the volatility of dichloromethane is a liability, as unsolvated triflyl azide is a detonation hazard. The reaction may also be carried out in toluene, acetonitrile, or pyridine.

 (Tf = )

The trifluoromethanesulfonic anhydride starting material is rather expensive, and the product is explosive, and does not store well. As a result, imidazole-1-sulfonyl azide has been developed as an alternative.

Reactions
Trifluoromethanesulfonyl azide generally converts amines to azides.

See also
 Tosyl azide
 Diphenylphosphoryl azide
 Sulfuryl diazide

References

Azido compounds
Triflyl compounds